The Forever Purge is a 2021 American dystopian action horror film directed by Everardo Valerio Gout and written by series creator James DeMonaco, who also produced along with Jason Blum and Michael Bay. Originally intended as the final installment, it serves as the fifth film in the Purge franchise and a direct sequel to 2016's The Purge: Election Year. The film stars Ana de la Reguera, Tenoch Huerta, Josh Lucas, Cassidy Freeman, Leven Rambin, Alejandro Edda, and Will Patton, and follows a group of people who attempt to escape from the United States after an insurrectionist movement continues committing crimes and murders nationwide after the 2049 Purge's ending.

Delayed from an original July 2020 date due to the COVID-19 pandemic, The Forever Purge was theatrically released on July 2, 2021, by Universal Pictures. The film grossed $77 million worldwide against its $18 million budget and received mixed reviews from critics, with praise for its performances and action sequences but criticism for its writing. A sixth film is currently in development.

Plot
In 2048, eight years after Charlene Roan's presidential election, the New Founding Fathers of America (NFFA) regain control of the U.S. government and have re-instituted the annual Purge with its original rules. Racial supremacy and nativism have surged nationwide following their re-election, and many outside the ruling party are concerned that the upcoming Purge will inflict more damage on the country than the NFFA realizes. Married migrant couple Juan and Adela illegally cross the border into Texas to escape from a Mexican drug cartel and build a new life, with Juan working as a farmhand on the Tucker family ranch while Adela begins working near Austin.

Ten months later, on the eve of the next annual Purge in 2049, Juan and Adela join a migrant community behind a walled sanctuary with armed security to protect them. As the Purge begins, Adela witnesses a nationalist Purger group, who declare themselves to be a "Purge Purification Force" (PPF) that intend to kill those people that they consider non-American. The group passes by without hostility, and the migrant community survives the Purge with no incidents. Come morning, Juan and Adela return to their jobs, but both notice that many of their co-workers did not report to work. Shortly after, Adela is attacked by two Purgers but she is rescued by her boss Darius before both are arrested by police for killing their attackers.
 
Meanwhile, Juan and fellow migrant co-worker T.T. discover that the Tucker family has been taken hostage by their farmhands, who reveal themselves as Purgers intending to take the ranch for themselves. Ranch owner Caleb Tucker sacrifices himself and distracts the Purgers long enough for Juan and T.T. to rescue his son Dylan, Dylan's pregnant wife Cassie, and his sister Harper, who offer them a ride to search for Adela. Nationwide news struggles to understand why civilians continue to celebrate the Purge after its ending. The group rescue Adela and Darius after the police van carrying them is ambushed by more Purgers. Darius stays behind to search for his family while the others escape from a burning Austin. At a gas station, they hear news reports about chaos, murder, and destruction in all fifty American states, with local emergency services overwhelmed, in an event described as the "Forever Purge". To protect non-Purger civilians, Canada and Mexico have opened their borders for the next six hours, following which the borders will close and entry would be denied. The group decide to escape across the Mexican border through El Paso.

By the time the group arrives in a chaotic El Paso, the NFFA has condemned the Forever Purge after their politicians and representatives are targeted, and invokes martial law across the United States in an effort to contain the violence. Fighting through El Paso, Adela and Cassie are split from the group by military forces while Juan, T.T., Dylan, and Harper are captured by the PPF, with their leader (referred to as "Alpha") offering Dylan and Harper a chance to live if they kill T.T. and Juan. When they refuse, the Purgers murder T.T. before the military intervenes, allowing the group to escape. However, the military is forced to withdraw when their base is destroyed by more Purgers. In response, the Canadian and Mexican governments announce the early closure of their borders, leaving those who tried to cross them vulnerable to the Purgers.

Downtown, Adela protects Cassie from other Purgers, revealing that she and Juan had once been members of a self-defense group who trained them to fight against Mexican drug cartels before they arrived to the United States. The survivors all reunite at a hidden safe-house run by a nearby Native American tribe. Their leader offers to transport everyone across the border as refugees. With the PPF in pursuit, Juan, Adela, and Dylan remain behind with other survivors to make time for the other refugees to escape. Both groups engage in a gunfight until their ammo runs out and draw them in for a close fight with hand weapons. In the ensuing battle, the Purgers are killed and Alpha takes Adela hostage. However, Juan and Dylan work together to subdue and kill Alpha, saving Adela. The trio rejoin the others in a refugee camp on the other side of the Mexican border where Dylan finds Harper and Cassie. The latter reveals that she had given birth during their time apart. After thanking each other for their help in surviving, Dylan introduces Juan and Adela to his infant daughter.

With the entire country in flames, the NFFA is blamed and disbanded for the prolonged violence. News reports indicate that more than two million Americans had crossed the Canadian and Mexican borders as refugees while others had rallied to fight back against the Purgers.

Cast

Production

Development
In October 2018, James DeMonaco, the creator of the Purge franchise, said that he may write another film, and that he thought it would be a "really cool ending" to the series.

In May 2019, Universal Pictures announced the development of the untitled film. DeMonaco was confirmed as writing the screenplay, and produced the film with Sébastien K. Lemercier through their company Man in a Tree Productions. Jason Blum also produced through Blumhouse Productions, along with Michael Bay, Brad Fuller, and Andrew Form through Platinum Dunes. The film is the fifth installment of the franchise, and is a direct sequel to The Purge: Election Year. In August 2019, it was announced that the film would be directed by Everardo Valerio Gout, who was hired based on his work directing episodes of the 2016 National Geographic series Mars.

Casting
In October 2019, it was announced that Ana de la Reguera would star in the film. In November 2019, Tenoch Huerta was cast as a male lead, and later that month, it was announced that Will Patton and Cassidy Freeman had been added as well. In January 2020, it was reported that Leven Rambin was cast, and Josh Lucas was also reported as playing a lead.

Filming
In July 2019, it was announced that the film would be shot in California. It was awarded nearly $6.5 million in tax credits by the California Film Commission, the second film in the franchise to receive credits from California, after The Purge: Anarchy. Production was set to begin in November 2019, with 25 days of filming in San Diego County.

On November 10 and 11, filming took place in downtown Pomona, on a block of storefronts transformed into fictional businesses, including a tavern and a gun store. The next week, filming took place at a theater and an American Legion post in Ontario. Cinematographer Luis Sansans shot the film with Arri Alexa Mini LF cameras and Camtec Falcon large format lenses. Filming wrapped in February 2020.

Music
The film's score was composed by The Newton Brothers.

Release

Theatrical
In April 2020, the film's title was revealed as The Forever Purge. The film was originally scheduled for a theatrical release in the United States on July 10, 2020, by Universal Pictures. On May 15, 2020, its release was postponed indefinitely due to the COVID-19 pandemic. On July 8, 2020, it was reported that the film had been rescheduled for July 9, 2021. On April 9, 2021, it was reported that the film's American release date had been pushed up a week to July 2.

The film premiered in South Korea on July 10, 2021, at the 25th Bucheon International Fantastic Film Festival.

Corona, California shooting
On July 26, 2021, during a midnight showing of The Forever Purge at the Regal Edwards movie theater in Corona, California, a gunman opened fire inside the cinema, killing two people. Police responding to the shooting apprehended a suspect later identified as 20-year-old Joseph Jimenez shortly after arriving on the scene. The victims were identified as 18-year-old Rylee Goodrich, who died instantly, and her friend, well-known 19-year-old TikToker Anthony Barajas, who was transported to the nearest hospital and was put on life support before dying from his injuries on July 31, 2021.

In the aftermath of the shooting, the theatre was temporarily closed and all showtimes of the film were removed from its listings. After her autopsy, Goodrich's body was cremated and her ashes scattered into the Pacific Ocean off the coast of Seal Beach, California. Universal Pictures and Blumhouse Productions declined to comment.

Home media
The Forever Purge was released as a video rental on July 23, 2021, was released on digital platforms and on Movies Anywhere on September 14, 2021, and Universal Pictures Home Entertainment/Studio Distribution Services released it on Ultra HD Blu-ray, DVD, and Blu-ray on September 28, 2021. Bonus features will include an alternate ending, deleted scenes and "Collapsing The System: Behind The Forever Purge" featurette. It was also released on DVD, Blu-ray and Ultra HD Blu-ray in the UK by Universal through Warner Bros. Home Entertainment on October 18, 2021.

The Forever Purge was released on HBO Max on April 15, 2022. It also was released on HBO.

Reception

Box office
The Forever Purge grossed $44.5 million in the United States and Canada, and $32.5 million in other territories, for a worldwide total of $77 million.

In the United States and Canada, The Forever Purge was released alongside The Boss Baby: Family Business, as well as the expansion of Summer of Soul, and was projected to gross around $10 million from 3,051 theaters in its opening weekend. The film made $5.4 million on its first day, including $1.3 million from Thursday night previews, the lowest amount of the franchise. It went on to debut to $12.7 million, finishing third at the box office. With the top three films at the box office, F9, Family Business, and The Forever Purge, all having been released by Universal, it marked the first time a single studio had done so since February 2005. The film fell 43.1% in its sophomore weekend to $7.1 million, finishing fourth, then made $4.2 million in its third weekend, finishing in sixth.

Critical response
On the review aggregator website Rotten Tomatoes, the film holds an approval rating of 49% based on 159 reviews, with an average rating of 5.4/10. The site's critics consensus reads, "The Forever Purge fails to fully engage with its most frighteningly timely themes, but the franchise remains largely—albeit bluntly—effective." On Metacritic, the film has a weighted average score of 53 out of 100, based on 33 critics, indicating "mixed or average reviews".  Audiences polled by CinemaScore gave the film an average grade of "B−" on an A+ to F scale, while PostTrak reported 72% of audience members gave it a positive score, with 53% saying they would definitely recommend it.

The Playlists Nick Allen gave the film "D+," writing that it "looks like a cheap TV movie" and that it "displays all that makes these movies a failed experiment in blockbuster exploitation." Reviewing for The A.V. Club, Anya Stanley gave the film a "D" grade and said, "In The Forever Purge, we're told a story that a battered nation has heard a lot—a sermon of immigration and class warfare that's too heavy-handed to say anything its prospective audience hasn't been told on countless social media feeds over the last few years." Rick Bentley's review in Tribune News Service complained of "a thinly veiled attempt to capitalize on the tensions currently gripping this country. The film’s deep dive into racism comes across as manipulative, trite and uninspired." Dustin Chase wrote in The Galveston Daily News, "The Forever Purge comes to Texas to try to redefine stale franchise."  Johnny Oleksinski's review in The New York Post stated, "That idea was fun once, maybe even twice, but by the fifth outing the formula has given way to preachiness and predictability."

Writing in The Detroit News, Adam Gram stated, "the fifth Purge talks a big game, employing all sorts of charged political words and theories, but doesn't do anything interesting with them."  Peter Vonder Haar's review in The Houston Press analyzed, "The biggest problem with The Forever Purge is how it abandons the central conceit of the series. Previous movies focused on the protagonists' struggle to survive until the end of the Purge while simultaneously giving us wider looks at the phenomenon itself. Here, with the murderousness extending indefinitely, the characters' situation is indistinguishable from any of a thousand other shoot-em-ups."  Candace McMillan wrote in Seattle Refined, the film "ultimately just a tiresome rehash of an overused adage. It's making an obvious statement about the callous attitude we as Americans take with those less fortunate, without accounting for the many complications and intricacies within our nation as well. But shock, awe, and letdown is all that's left of a franchise that's been bled dry."

Matthew Mongale's review for The Austin Chronicle dismissed the film as "pretty much by the numbers", while Nick Rogers in The Midwest Film Journal called the film, "The creative exhaustion of a once-engaging franchise."  Ian Freer's review for Empire wrote, "The fifth Purge outing goes for broke and comes out wanting, working neither as political commentary nor horror-action-thriller."

Sequel
Although The Forever Purge was intended to be the final installment of the franchise, producer Jason Blum stated in June 2021 that he intends to make additional Purge films, and that he is working on convincing James DeMonaco to continue the story. In July 2021, DeMonaco confirmed his concept for a sixth film to focus on Frank Grillo's character Leo Barnes from Anarchy and Election Year, and to incorporate a worldwide Purge, a concept developed for a potential third season of The Purge television series, which was scrapped.

References

External links
 
 

2021 action thriller films
2021 horror thriller films
2021 science fiction horror films
2020s serial killer films
American action horror films
American action thriller films
American dystopian films
American horror thriller films
American pregnancy films
American science fiction action films
American science fiction horror films
American science fiction thriller films
American serial killer films
American sequel films
Films about coups d'état
Films about Mexican drug cartels
Films about terrorism in the United States
Films postponed due to the COVID-19 pandemic
Films produced by Michael Bay
Films produced by Jason Blum
Films produced by Andrew Form
Films produced by Bradley Fuller
Films scored by the Newton Brothers
Films set in 2048
Films set in 2049
Films set in El Paso, Texas
Films set in Mexico
Films set in Texas
Films shot in California
Films with screenplays by James DeMonaco
Urban survival films
Perfect World Pictures films
Platinum Dunes films
Blumhouse Productions films
The Purge films
Social science fiction films
Universal Pictures films
2020s American films